Amaliegade 12 is a historic property in the Frederiksstaden Quarter of central Copenhagen, Denmark. Count Christian Ditlev Frederik Reventlow lived in the building when he was appointed to Prime Minister in 179 and it has also housed the American diplomatic mission to Denmark. The law firm Moltje-Leth Advokater is now based in the building. The building was listed on the Danish registry of protected buildings and places in 1918.

History

18th century
Amaliegade 12 was built in 1753-55 by Nicolai Eigtved  for the timber merchant Dittleff Lindenhoff. Eigtved had also created the overall plan for the new Frederiksstaden district just a few years earlier.

In the new cadastre of 1756, the property was listed as No. 71 L. On VCristian Gedde's district map of St. Ann's East Quarter from 1757, it was marked as  No. 319. It was by then owned by one etatsråd baron Wedel. 

Adam Wilhelm Hauch, a military officer who was appointed to chamberlain that same year, acquired the building in 1782. He lived in the house until 1785 and went on a longer journey in Europe the following year.

19th century
 
In the new cadastre of 1806m the property was listed as No. 120.
The house was in 1783 acquired by Christian Ditlev Frederik Reventlow as his city home. He was also the owner of Christianssæde and Pederstrup on Lolland and played a central role in the Danish agricultural reforms of the 1780s and 1790s and was appointed as  Minister of the State in 1797. The property was in the new cadastre of 1806 listed as St. Ann's Quarter, No. 120. In 1814, Reventlow parted with the property in Amaliegade.

The property was at the time of the 1850 census, No. 120 was home to a total of 29 people. Ritmester Hans Juel (1797-) resided with his wife Amalie Christiane Juel (1800-), four children on the second floor. Count Alfonso Maria de Aguirre y Gadea Yoldi (1764-1852), an exiled Spanish count who had been appointed as lord chamberlain in 1828, resided on the first floor. Countess Christiane M. Bille (1771-1844) resided as a widow with two sons, Nanna Haraldine Bojesen and three maids on the ground floor.

Notables who have lived in the building for shorter periods of time include the painter Christian Albrecht Jensen (1825), the economist C. G. N. David (1830-31), count Frederik Marcus (1845) and the politician Carl Emil Bardenfleth  (1852).

With the introduction of house numbering in Copenhagen in 1859, St. Ann's East Quarter, No. 120 became Amaliegade 12.

20th century
 
The American diplomatic mission was based in the building in the first half of the 20th century. In 193336, Ruth Bryan Owen served as American ambassador to Denmark as the first woman to hold this post. From her window in the embassy, she often watched the Royal Life Guards pass through the street. Especially captain Børge Rohde, with whom she later formed a relationship, caught her attention. They were later married in the United States. The embassy was temporarily closed during the Second World War. The embassy left the building when the new embassy on Dag Hammarskjölds Allé was inaugurated in 1954. Ruth Bryan Owen visited Copenhagen for the inauguration, but died from a heart attack the day before the inauguration on 27 May.

Today
The building was in 2008 owned by Amaliegade 12 APS. The law firm Moltke-Leth Advokater is now based in the building.

See also
 Listed buildings in Copenhagen Municipality

References

External links

 Amaliegade at indenforvoldene.dk
 Source

Listed buildings and structures in Copenhagen
Residential buildings completed in 1755
Frederiksstaden
Buildings and structures associated with the Reventlow family